Planta is a surname of Swiss origin.

List of people with the surname 
 Albert Planta (1868–1952), Canadian senator and financial agent
 Claudio von Planta (born 1962), Swiss cameraman
 Andrew Planta (1717–1773), Swiss pastor and librarian of the British Museum
 Elizabeth Planta (1740/41–1823), governess of Mary Bowes, Countess of Strathmore and Kinghorne and her children, daughter of Andrew Planta
 Joseph Planta (librarian) (1744–1827), Swiss Principal Librarian of the British Museum, son of Andrew Planta
 Frederica Planta (1750–1778), governess and English teacher for the children of George III and Queen Charlotte of Great Britain, daughter of Andrew Planta
 Sir Joseph Planta (1787–1847), British diplomat and politician, son of the librarian Joseph Planta

See also
Planta (disambiguation)

Surnames of Swiss origin